Lydia Yudifovna Berdyaev ( 20 August 1871, Kharkov, Russian Empire - September 1945, Clamart, France) was a Russian poet, member of Russian apostolate and leader of the Russian diaspora in France.

Biography
She was born in Kharkov, into an Orthodox family. Her father served as a Civil law notary at the Kharkov District Court.

Her first marriage was with Baron Victor Ivanovich Rapp, an official of Kharkov Chamber of Control and coowner of the publishing house "V.I. Rapp and V. Potapov."

She was member of the Kharkov Union of the Russian Social Democratic Labour Party, for which she was arrested on 6 January 1900 and jailed for a month. After her release, she went to Paris to study at the School of Social Sciences. She divorced her first husband.

On 19 February 1904 she met her future second. husband, the philosopher Nikolai Berdyaev, in Kiev. In 1918, when he was seriously ill with pneumonia, she was reading a book about Saint Teresa of Avila, which is how she developed an interest in Catholic mysticism. Berdyaev introduced her to the priest Vladimir Abrikosov and on 7 June 1918 she converted to Catholicism. In 1922, Berdyaev was in exile, living in Germany and in France. Berdyaev became an assistant of her husband, editing his articles and books, preparing them for publication. In addition, she was an active parishioner of the Parish of the Holy Trinity in Paris, where she took part in the charitable and pastoral projects of charity. She died in Clamart in 1945 from throat cancer.

References
 Berdyaev Lili. Occupation: wife of the philosopher / Comp., Bus. predisl.yu and comment. EV Bronnikov. M. Mol. Guard, 2002. - 262.

External links
 http://krotov.info/library/02_b/berdyaev/de1936trush_00.html
 http://www.proza.ru/2008/08/25/212

1871 births
1945 deaths
Russian women poets
Converts to Eastern Catholicism from Eastern Orthodoxy
Former Russian Orthodox Christians
Russian Eastern Catholics
Emigrants from the Russian Empire to France
Eastern Catholic poets
Deaths from throat cancer
Deaths from cancer in France
Russian Catholic poets